Gabriel Biancheri (1 October 1943, Oullins - Rhône 28 December 2010) was a member of the National Assembly of France.  He represented the 4th constituency of the Drôme department, as a member of the Union for a Popular Movement, from 2002 until his death in 2010.
He was succeeded in the constituency by his substitute in the 2007 election, Marie-Hélène Thoraval.

References

1943 births
2010 deaths
People from Oullins
Politicians from Auvergne-Rhône-Alpes
Rally for the Republic politicians
Union for a Popular Movement politicians
Deputies of the 12th National Assembly of the French Fifth Republic
Deputies of the 13th National Assembly of the French Fifth Republic